The Moment to Kill is a 1968 Spaghetti Western film.

It was the first film entirely directed by Giuliano Carnimeo.

Cast 
 George Hilton: Lord
 Walt Barnes: Bull
 Loni von Friedl: Regina Forrester
 Horst Frank: Jason Forrester
 Rudolf Schündler: Thomas B. Warren
 Arturo Dominici: Innkeeper

Release 
The film was released in West Germany on 28 November 1968 as Django: Ein Sarg voll Blut ("Django: A Coffin Full of Blood").

References

External links 

1968 films
Spaghetti Western films
1968 Western (genre) films
Films directed by Giuliano Carnimeo
Films scored by Francesco De Masi
West German films
Films shot in Almería
1960s Italian films